The squid giant synapse is a chemical synapse found in squid. It is the largest chemical junction in nature.

Anatomy
The squid giant synapse (Fig 1) was first recognized by John Zachary Young in 1939. It lies in the stellate ganglion on each side of the midline, at the posterior wall of the squid’s muscular mantle. Activation of this synapse triggers a synchronous contraction of the mantle musculature, causing the forceful ejection of a jet of water from the mantle. This water propulsion allows the squid to move rapidly through the water and even to jump through the surface of the water (breaking the air-water interface) to escape predators.

The signal to the mantle is transmitted via a chain consisting of three giant neurons organized in sequence. The first is located in the ventral magnocellular lobe, central to the eyes. It serves as a central integrating manifold that receives all sensory systems and consists of two symmetrical neurons (I). 
They, in turn, contact secondary neurons (one in each side) in the dorsal magnocellular lobe and (II) and in turn contact the tertiary giant axons in the stellate ganglion (III, one in each side of the mantle). These latter are the giant axons that the work of Alan Hodgkin and Andrew Huxley made famous. Each secondary axon branches at the stellate ganglion and contacts all the tertiary axons; thus, information concerning relevant sensory input is relayed from the sense organs in the cephalic ganglion (the squid’s brain) to the contractile muscular mantle (which is activated directly by the tertiary giant axons).

Electrophysiology
Many essential elements of how all chemical synapses function were first discovered by studying the squid giant synapse. Early electrophysiological studies demonstrated the chemical nature of transmission at this synapse by making simultaneous intracellular recording from the presynaptic and postsynaptic terminals in vitro. Classical experiments later on demonstrated that, in the absence of action potentials, transmission could occur. The calcium hypothesis for synaptic transmission was directly demonstrated in this synapse by showing that at the equilibrium potential for calcium, no transmitter is released . Thus, calcium entry and not the change in the transmembrane electric field per se is responsible for transmitter release (Llinás et al. 1981). This preparation continues to be the most useful for the study of the molecular and cell biological basis for transmitter release. Other important new mammalian preparations are now available for such studies  such as the calyx of Held.

See also
Squid giant axon

References

 
 
 
 
 
 
 
 
 
 
 
 

Cephalopod zootomy
Giant synapse